Seaford High School may refer to several high schools in the United States:

 Seaford Senior High School, located in Seaford, Delaware
 Seaford High School (New York), located in Seaford, New York